The Government Secretariat (known as 布政司署 before 1997) is collectively formed by the Offices of the Chief Secretary and the Financial Secretary and thirteen policy bureaux.

The offices are officially known as "Government Secretariat: Offices of the Chief Secretary for Administration and the Financial Secretary", and the bureaux are officially known as "<Portfolio> Bureau, Government Secretariat" or "Government Secretariat: <Portfolio> Bureau".

History 
The structure of the Government Secretariat has undergone periodic changes.

The McKinsey Report
Governor Sir Murray MacLehose commissioned McKinsey & Company to conduct a study on the structure of the Hong Kong Government. Sir MacLehose subsequently restructured the Government Secretariat pursuant to recommendations in the McKinsey Report in 1973.

Branches of the Government Secretariat under the Colonial Secretary:
 Environment Branch (-1981)
 Home Affairs Branch
 Social Services Branch
 Housing Branch
 Security Branch
 Civil Service Branch 
 New Territories Branch (1974-)
 Administration Branch (1975-1978)

Branches of the Government Secretariat under the Financial Secretary:
 Financial Branch (-1976); replaced by the Monetary Affairs Branch (1976-)
 Economic Services Branch

Reorganisation in the 1980s
New branches of the Government Secretariat were established in the 1980s.

Branches of the Government Secretariat under the Chief Secretary:
 Environment Branch (-1981)
 Home Affairs Branch
 Social Services Branch (-1983); replaced by the Health & Welfare Branch (1983-)
 Housing Branch
 Security Branch
 Civil Service Branch 
 New Territories Branch (-1981); replaced by the City & N.T. Administration Branch (1981-1983) and renamed the District Administration Branch (1983-)
 News Branch (1979-1981)
 Education Branch (1980-1983); renamed the Education & Manpower Branch (1983-)
 Transport Branch (1981-)
 Lands & Works Branch (1981-)
 General Duties Branch (1982-)
 Municipal Services Branch (1985-)

Branches of the Government Secretariat under the Financial Secretary:
 Economic Services Branch
 Monetary Affairs Branch (1976-)
 Trade & industry Branch (1982-)

1989 reorganisation
In the 1 September 1989 reorganisation, the Recreation and Culture Branch (RCB) was created, taking on some duties from the Municipal Services Branch, such as for culture and recreation, sports, antiquities and country parks management, and others from the Administrative Services and Information Branch, including broadcasting, entertainment and censorship policy.  Both branches then ceased to exist. The RCB operated as a Broadcasting, Entertainment and Administration wing, which covered RTHK and TELA, and the Recreation and Culture wing, with responsibilities including sport.

Branches of the Government Secretariat under the Chief Secretary:
 General Duties Branch (-1990)
 Constitutional Affairs Branch
 Education & Manpower Branch
 Civil Service Branch 
 Home Affairs Branch
 Planning, Environment & Lands Branch
 Broadcasting, Culture & Sports Branch
 Security Branch
 Health & Welfare Branch
 Transport Branch
 Housing Branch (1994-)

Branches of the Government Secretariat under the Financial Secretary:
 Finance Branch
 Works Branch
 Economic Services Branch
 Monetary Affairs Branch (-1993); replaced by the Financial Services Branch (1993-)
 Trade & industry Branch

Structure of the Government Secretariat, 1997-2002
Branches of the Government Secretariat under the Chief Secretary for Administration:
 Education Bureau
 Constitutional Affairs Bureau
 Civil Service Bureau
 Home Affairs Bureau
 Planning, Environment and Lands Bureau (1997-99); renamed the Planning and Lands Bureau (2000-)
 Environment and Food Bureau (2000-)
 Housing Bureau
 Security Bureau
 Health and Welfare Bureau
 Transport Bureau

Bureaux under the Financial Secretary:
 Broadcasting, Culture and Sports Bureau (1997-98)
 Information Technology and Broadcast Bureau (1998-)
 Works Bureau
 Economic Services Bureau
 Finance Bureau
 Financial Services Bureau
 Trade and Industry Bureau

Structure of policy bureaux, 2002-2007
The Government Secretariat was reorganised in Tung Chee-hwa's second term upon the implementation of the Principal Officials Accountability System on 1 July 2002:

Civil Service Bureau
Commerce, Industry and Technology Bureau
Constitutional Affairs Bureau
Economic Development and Labour Bureau
Education and Manpower Bureau
Environment, Transport and Works Bureau 
Financial Services and the Treasury Bureau
Health, Welfare and Food Bureau
Home Affairs Bureau
Housing, Planning and Lands Bureau
Security Bureau

Structure of policy bureaux, 2007-2022
A reorganisation of the secretariat was announced by Donald Tsang after his re-election as Chief Executive in 2007. The number of policy bureaux was increased from 11 to 12 as a consequence of this re-organisation; minor adjustments were also made to the responsibilities of the principal officials. Then-Chief Executive Leung Chun-ying established the Innovation and Technology Bureau in 2015.

Bureaux under the Chief Secretary for Administration:
Civil Service Bureau
Constitutional and Mainland Affairs Bureau
Education Bureau
Environment Bureau
Food and Health Bureau
Home Affairs Bureau
Labour and Welfare Bureau
Security Bureau
Transport and Housing Bureau

Bureaux under the Financial Secretary:
Commerce and Economic Development Bureau
Development Bureau
Financial Services and the Treasury Bureau
Innovation and Technology Bureau (2015-)

Present Structure of the Government Secretariat, 2022-
Pursuant to the 2021 Policy address, Carrie Lam announced a government restructuring proposal in January 2022 to be considered and implemented by the Chief Executive-elect returned by the 2022 Chief Executive election. The proposal was adopted by Chief Executive-elect John Lee Ka-chiu; requisite funding was approved by the Finance Committee of the Legislative Council on 10 June 2022.

Bureaux under the Chief Secretary for Administration:
Civil Service Bureau
Constitutional and Mainland Affairs Bureau
Culture, Sports and Tourism Bureau
Education Bureau
Environment and Ecology Bureau
Health Bureau
Home and Youth Affairs Bureau
Labour and Welfare Bureau
Security Bureau

Bureaux under the Financial Secretary:
Commerce and Economic Development Bureau
Development Bureau
Financial Services and the Treasury Bureau
Housing Bureau
Innovation, Technology & Industry Bureau
Transport and Logistics Bureau

Reorganisation Proposals

2012 Proposal
In April 2012, Chief Executive-elect Leung Chun-ying announced his plan to reform the government, "aimed at providing better service to the public while boosting governance". Under the plan, two more deputy secretaries are to be created – a new deputy chief secretary and deputy financial secretary – to join the chief secretary, financial secretary, and secretary for justice. Leung announced his desire to create a Culture Bureau; Housing and Transport would be split into two bureaux and Housing would merge with Lands and planning. The newly created Deputy chief secretary position will be responsible for the Labour and Welfare, Education and cultural affairs bureaux. The Chief Secretary is to oversee the environment, Food and health, Home affairs, Security, Civil service, and Constitutional and mainland affairs. The Financial Secretary is to oversee Housing, planning and lands, Works, Transport and Financial Services and the treasury bureaux. The Deputy financial secretary will be in overall charge of the Commerce, industrial and tourism, as well as the Information and technology bureaux. To allow for a smooth transition, the government agreed to table Leung's restructuring plan before LegCo before it dissolved for the summer. However, Pan Democrats believed careful scrutiny was necessary, and strongly opposed the plan to rush through the changes; People Power representatives in Legco warned they would table some 900 motions at the Finance Committee meeting on 15 June and over 100 amendments at the plenary council meeting on 20 June.

Bureaux under the Chief Secretary for Administration:
Civil Service Bureau
Constitutional and Mainland Affairs Bureau
Environment Bureau
Food and Health Bureau
Home Affairs Bureau
Security Bureau

Bureaux under the Deputy Chief Secretary for Administration:
Education Bureau
Labour and Welfare Bureau
Culture Bureau

Bureaux under the Financial Secretary:
Financial Services and the Treasury Bureau
Housing, Planning and Lands Bureau
Transport and Works Bureau

Bureaux under the Deputy Financial Secretary:
Commerce and Industries Bureau
Technology and Communication Bureau

See also

Politics of Hong Kong
Government departments and agencies in Hong Kong

References

External links
Re-organisation of Policy Bureaux of the Government Secretariat

Hong Kong government departments and agencies